James Brodie (born 19 March 1937) is a South African former cricketer. He played twenty-two first-class matches for Cambridge University Cricket Club and Eastern Province between 1959 and 1964.

See also
 List of Cambridge University Cricket Club players

References

External links
 

1937 births
Living people
South African cricketers
Cambridge University cricketers
Eastern Province cricketers
People from Graaff-Reinet
Berkshire cricketers
Cricketers from the Eastern Cape